The bobolink (Dolichonyx oryzivorus) is a small New World blackbird and the only member of the genus Dolichonyx. An old name for this species is the "rice bird", from its tendency to feed on cultivated grains during winter and migration. The bobolink breeds in the summer in United States and Canada, with most of the summer range in the northern U.S. Bobolinks winter in southern South America, primarily Paraguay, Argentina, and Bolivia. Bobolink populations are rapidly declining due to numerous factors, such as agricultural intensification and habitat loss; they are considered threatened in Canada, and are at risk throughout their range.

Etymology

The English "Bobolink" is from Bob o' Lincoln, describing the call.

Description
Measurements:

 Length: 
 Weight: 
 Wingspan: 

Adult males are mostly black with creamy napes and white scapulars, lower backs, and rumps. Adult females are mostly light brown with black streaks on the back and flanks, and dark stripes on the head; their wings and tails are darker.

Distribution and movements
The bobolink breeds in the summer in North America across much of southern Canada and the northern United States; from 1966 to 2015 the species experienced a greater than 1.5% annual population decrease throughout most of its breeding range, extending from the Midwestern United States to the Canadian maritimes. The bobolink migrates long distances, wintering in southern South America.

Bobolinks often migrate in flocks, feeding on cultivated grains and rice, which leads to them being considered a pest by farmers in some areas. Although bobolinks migrate long distances, they have rarely been sighted in Europe — like many vagrants from the Americas, the majority of records are from the British Isles.

The species has been known in the southern United States as the "reedbird," or the "ricebird" from their consumption of large amounts of the grain from rice fields in South Carolina and the Gulf States during their southward migration in the fall. One of the species' main migration routes is through Jamaica, where they are called "butter-birds" and at least historically were collected as food, having fattened up on the aforementioned rice.

Bobolinks are the only species of landbird known to annually migrate through the Galápagos Islands, which are over 2,000 km from their primary migration route. A bobolink was collected in the Galápagos Islands by Charles Darwin in 1835. Bobolinks have been hypothesized to act as vectors for avian malaria-causing parasites arriving in the Islands. Additionally, bobolinks in the Galápagos have been found with seeds from Drymaria cordata, a plant native to the Galápagos but highly invasive elsewhere, entangled in their feathers, potentially spreading them to the mainland.

Behaviour

Breeding
Their breeding habitats are open grassy fields, especially hay fields, across North America. In high-quality habitats, males are often polygynous. Females lay five to six eggs in a cup-shaped nest, which is always situated on the ground and is usually well-hidden in dense vegetation. Both parents feed the young.

Feeding
Bobolinks forage on or near the ground, and mainly eat seeds and insects. They are nicknamed the "" because of their predation on large numbers of armyworms, including the true armyworm (Mythimna unipuncta) and the fall armyworm (Spodoptera frugiperda), acting as a natural pest control. In Florida, bobolinks feed most often on the Fall armyworm and not the True armyworm because one is common and one is rare there.

Calls
Males sing bright, bubbly songs in flight.

Status and conservation
During the 1800s the bobolink, like many birds, was slaughtered in large numbers for the meat trade.

The numbers of these birds are declining due to loss of habitat. Bobolinks are a species at risk in Nova Scotia, and throughout Canada. In Vermont, a 75% decline was noted between 1966 and 2007. Originally, they were found in tallgrass prairie and other open areas with dense grass. Although hay fields are suitable nesting habitat, fields which are harvested early, or at multiple times, in a season may not allow sufficient time for young birds to fledge. Delaying hay harvests by just 1.5 weeks can improve bobolink survival by 20%. This species increased in numbers when horses were the primary mode of transportation, requiring larger supplies of hay.

A 2021 study found that the reintroduction of American bison across the United States was detrimental to bobolink populations, with adult populations dropping as much as 62% and juvenile populations as much as 84%. This is presumed to be due to many new bison herds being managed more as livestock than wildlife, often kept in fenced pastures and protected from predation, which encourages overgrazing, trampling, and rapid multiplying. The study also found that lighter grazing by bison did not have the same harmful effects, demonstrating that the two species could likely coexist under the right circumstances.

Media references
Emily Dickinson penned many poems about or mentioning the bird. Edgar Allan Poe mentions the bird in "Landor's Cottage". William Cullen Bryant wrote about the bob-o'-link in his poem "Robert of Lincoln."

The bobolink is mentioned in the song Evelina by Harold Arlen and Yip Harburg, from the musical Bloomer Girl:

Evelina, won't ya ever take a shine to that moon?
Evelina, ain't ya bothered by the Bobolink's tune?

The bird is also one of the many important ornithological references in Vladimir Nabokov's John Shade's poem "Pale Fire" in the novel of the same name.

Sophie Jewett ends her poem "An Exile's Garden" (1910) with a reference to a bobolink.

The bobolink is also mentioned in the film The Mouse on the Moon in connection with the fictional European microstate of Grand Fenwick, where oddly the bird is apparently common.

The bobolink is also mentioned in the musical Camelot. Words by Alan Jay Lerner.

The bobolink is mentioned in the song, “The Wind,” by Billy Bob Thornton, written by Warren Zevon.

Gallery

References

External links

Smithsonian Migratory Bird Center: Bobolink
Bobolink – Cornell Lab of Ornithology
The Nature Conservancy's Grassland Birds: Bobolink
Bobolink - Dolichonyx oryzivorus - USGS Patuxent Bird Identification InfoCenter
 
 

Icteridae
Birds of North America
Birds of South America
Birds described in 1758
Taxa named by Carl Linnaeus
Extant Pleistocene first appearances